Jūzō, Juzo or Juuzou (written: 十三 or 重蔵) is a masculine Japanese given name. Notable people with the name include:

 (1933–1997), Japanese actor and film director
 (born 1923), Japanese baseball player
 (born 1941), Japanese manga artist

Fictional characters
, a character in the 1969 novel The Gate of Youth by Hiroyuki Itsuki and its film and television adaptations
, a character in the manga series Tokyo Ghoul
, a character in the manga series Boku no Hero Academia
, a character in the anime series Danganronpa 3: The End of Hope's Peak High School
, a character in the Samurai Sentai Shinkenger
Jūzō Okita, a character in Space Battleship Yamato

Japanese masculine given names